George Jonathan Sargent (2 August 1882 – 18 June 1962) was an English professional golfer.

Early life 
Sargent was born in Brockham, Surrey, England to William Henry Sargent and Amelia Jane Harkett. The family moved to Epsom when he was young and he began his golf career at age twelve at Epsom Downs Golf Club in his home county.

Professional career 
In 1899 Sargent spent some time at Ganton Golf Club under Harry Vardon. He first made an impact in the 1901 Open Championship at Muirfield where we was in 6th place after the first round. Soon afterwards he became the professional at Dewsbury Golf Club. Later he moved to Canada, where he served as a professional at Royal Ottawa Golf Club and finished second in the 1908 Canadian Open.

Sargent won the 1909 U.S. Open at Englewood Golf Club in New Jersey. He set a new 72-hole scoring record for the tournament of 290. He played in sixteen U.S. Open in total, and finished in the top-10 six times. He also won the 1912 Canadian Open and the 1918 Minnesota State Open.

He is credited with introducing the use of motion pictures to study the golf swing. In the early 1910s be started work as a club professional. He was head professional at Scioto Country Club in Ohio from 1912 to 1924. Sargent became a member of the Professional Golfers' Association of America at its inception in 1916 and served as president for five years. After his stay at Scioto he moved onto Interlachen Country Club in Minneapolis, Minnesota from 1924 to 1928. He then moved to Maryland to work at Chevy Chase Club. He worked there from 1928 to 1932. His final club professional job was at East Lake Golf Club in Atlanta, Georgia from 1932 until his retirement fifteen years later. He is a member of the Georgia Golf Hall of Fame.

Personal life 
He married Beatrice Margaret Pearse (1886–1968) in 1907 and fathered eleven children. Like him, his sons Harold and Jack are members of the Georgia Golf Hall of Fame.

Professional wins 

 1909 U.S. Open
 1912 Canadian Open
 1918 Minnesota State Open

Major championships

Wins (1)

Results timeline

NYF = Tournament not yet founded
NT = No tournament
WD = Withdrew
CUT = missed the half-way cut
R64, R32, R16, QF, SF = Round in which player lost in PGA Championship match play
"T" indicates a tie for a place

References

External links
Georgia Golf Hall of Fame profile

English male golfers
Winners of men's major golf championships
Golf administrators
People from Dorking
1882 births
1962 deaths